The Perfect Thing: How the iPod Shuffles Commerce, Culture, and Coolness is a book written by Steven Levy, an American journalist. It covers the growth of the idea of Apple's very own iPod, from its origins before its introduction in 2001 to its development to the iPod Nano and the fifth-generation video iPod.

Synopsis
In an author's note, Levy writes,

Contents
Perfect
Identity
Origin
Cool
Personal
Download
Shuffle
Apple
Podcast
Coda

Levy starts the book with a timeline of the iPod, running from October 2001 to October 2005. He then writes in a shuffled set of chapters, focusing on the "perfect" aspects of the iPod—the origins and the idea of the iPod, its ability to create an identity and a familiar community, its coolness factor, how it made music personal for individuals, and how it changed the music industry with Apple's iTunes Store.

The book includes quotes, interviews, and anecdotes with such individuals as Apple's co-founder and CEO, Steve Jobs; Microsoft chairman, Bill Gates; cultural anthropologist at the University of Utrecht and noted "Professor of Cool," Dr. Carl Rohde; founder of MP3.com, Michael Robertson; and many others.

Reception
Publishers Weekly wrote: "Combining upbeat reportage about the device's origins and development with higher-minded ruminations about its place at 'the center of just about every controversy in the digital age,' he explores how the iPod 'set the technology world, the business world, and especially the music industry on its head.'"

Cory Doctorow of Boing Boing wrote: "The impact of "shuffling," of carrying your collection in your pocket, of putting digital music in the hands of info-civilians who never would have put up with the crummy design and arcane interfaces of the early competitors—these are big stories that will play out for decades yet, and Levy's book does the best job I've yet seen of categorizing and taking the measure of these great shifts."

References

External links
C-SPAN Q&A interview with Levy on The Perfect Thing, December 24, 2006

2006 non-fiction books
Technology books
IPod
Simon & Schuster books
Books about Apple Inc.
Books by Steven Levy